Woizero Yeshimebet Ali was the wife of Ras Makonnen and mother of Emperor Haile Selassie of Ethiopia. She was the daughter of Dejazmatch Ali Gonshur, who was from Wollo and a former trader from Gondar. Yeshimebet died during her son's infancy. Her mother and her sister Woizero Mammit helped care for her young son as he grew to adulthood. She had eight miscarriages before giving birth to Haile Selassie.

References 

Ethiopian Royal Family
Year of death unknown
19th-century Ethiopian people
Year of birth unknown

Deaths in childbirth